The Roman Catholic Archdiocese of Xi'an is an archdiocese located in the city of Xi’an (Shaanxi) in China.

History
 April 12, 1911: Established as Apostolic Vicariate of Central Shensi 陝西中境 from the Apostolic Vicariate of Northern Shensi 陝西北境
 December 3, 1924: Renamed as Apostolic Vicariate of Xi’anfu 西安府
 April 11, 1946: Promoted as Metropolitan Archdiocese of Xi’an 西安

Leadership
 Archbishops of Xi’an 西安 (Roman rite)
 Archbishop Anthony Dang Mingyan, (2006–present)
 Archbishop Anthony Li Du-an (李笃安), (5 April 1987 - 25 May 2006)
 Bishop Pacific Li Huan-de, O.F.M. (Apostolic Administrator January 25, 1952–1972)
 Archbishop Pacifico Giulio Vanni, O.F.M. (April 11, 1946 - May 10, 1952)
 Vicars Apostolic of Xi’anfu 西安府 (Roman Rite)
 Bishop Pacifico Giulio Vanni, O.F.M. (later Archbishop) (June 14, 1932–April 11, 1946)
 Bishop Fiorenzo Umberto Tessiatore, O.F.M. (May 16, 1928–April 10, 1932)
 Bishop Eugenio Massi, O.F.M. (December 3, 1924–January 26, 1927)
 Vicars Apostolic of Central Shensi 陝西中境 (Roman Rite)
 Bishop Eugenio Massi, O.F.M. (July 7, 1916–December 3, 1924)
 Bishop Auguste-Jean-Gabriel Maurice, O.F.M. (April 12, 1911–January 1916)

Suffragan dioceses
 Fengxiang 鳳翔
 Hanzhong 漢中
 Sanyuan 三原
 Yan’an 延安
 Zhouzhi 盩厔

See also 

 St. Francis Cathedral of Xi'an
 Roman Catholicism in Shaanxi

References

Sources
 GCatholic.org
 Catholic Hierarchy
 Official website 

Roman Catholic dioceses in China
Christian organizations established in 1911
Christianity in Shaanxi
Religion in Xi'an